John Douglas Watsford (27 February 1876 – 4 December 1915) was an Australian rules footballer who played with Collingwood in the Victorian Football League (VFL).

Notes

External links 

		
Doug Watsford's profile at Collingwood Forever

1876 births
1915 deaths
Australian rules footballers from Ballarat
Collingwood Football Club players
Dandenong Football Club players